The 2014 Bandy World Championship was held between 26 January and 2 February 2014, in Irkutsk and Shelekhov, Russia. 17 nations participated in the tournament, playing in two divisions partitioned into two subdivisions. A team representing Somalia took part, the first squad from Africa to play in the Bandy World Championship.

Participating teams

Division A

Division B

Venues 
Trud Stadium, Irkutsk (capacity: 16,500)
Rekord Stadium, Irkutsk (capacity: 5,300)
Zenith Stadium, Irkutsk (capacity: 4,000)
Stroitel Stadium, Shelekhov (capacity: 4,000)

Division A 
 After drawn games in the group stage, a penalty shootout is held to determine final placings in the event of teams finishing on equal points

Preliminary round

Group A 

All times are local (UTC+8).

Group B

Knockout stage

Quarter-finals

Semi-finals

Third place game

Final

Consolation tournament

5–8th place semifinals

7th place game

5th place game

Final standings

Division B 
 After drawn games in the group stage, a penalty shootout is held to determine final placings in the event of teams finishing on equal points

Preliminary round

Group C

Group D 

Matches in Group D are 60 minutes in duration rather than the standard 90 minutes

Knockout phase

Quarterfinals

Match for 7th place (60 mins)

Match for 5th place (60 mins)

Match for 8th place (60 mins)

Semi-finals

Match for third place

Final

Final standings

Sources 
Bandy World Championships 2014 Official Website (English and Russian)
Federation of International Bandy Official Website (English)

References

External links
 Russia - Sweden game of 29 Jan 2014 at Youtube with Russian commentators (the game starts about 17:40 in)

2014 in Russian sport
2014
World Championships,2014
World Championship
Sport in Irkutsk
January 2014 sports events in Asia
February 2014 sports events in Russia